Kevin Bradley Miller (born September 2, 1965) is an American former professional ice hockey player.

Early life
Miller was born in Lansing, Michigan. As a youth, he played in the 1978 Quebec International Pee-Wee Hockey Tournament with the Detroit Little Caesars minor ice hockey team.

Career 
A two-way forward, Miller was drafted by the New York Rangers in 1984. He would also go on to play with the Detroit Red Wings, Washington Capitals, St. Louis Blues, San Jose Sharks, Pittsburgh Penguins, Chicago Blackhawks, New York Islanders and Ottawa Senators.

After playing for the Senators during the 1999–2000 NHL season, Miller spent several years in Switzerland before returning to play in North America and would play several games for the Red Wings in 2003–04. Miller retired from active professional play in 2005.

Andrew McKim incident 
On June 5, 2014, U.S. District Judge Gordon Jay Quist ruled against Miller for a hit from behind during an October 31, 2000, Swiss league game that ended Andrew McKim's career. After the collision, McKim was hospitalized for weeks with a concussion and a sprain of the cervical spine and never returned to the ice. Miller was charged and convicted of simple bodily harm, intentional bodily harm and gross negligence in Switzerland's Canton of Zürich in 2004. The insurance company asked the U.S. court to recognize a Swiss court's $1.1 million judgement against Miller, which increased to $1.6 million with interest and costs. Miller previously refused to pay the Swiss court's judgment, however Judge Gordon Quist said in its ruling that his court was adhering to the Uniform Foreign-Country Judgments Recognition Act, and ordered Miller to pay the $1.6 million judgement.

Personal life
He is one of the three Miller brothers, along with Kelly and Kip, who played in the NHL. He is also a cousin of former NHL goaltender Ryan Miller and Ryan's brother Drew Miller who also played in the NHL. He is the father of figure skater Hannah Miller.

Career statistics

Regular season and playoffs

International

See also
Notable families in the NHL

References

External links

Profile at hockeydraftcentral.com

1965 births
Living people
American men's ice hockey right wingers
Chicago Blackhawks players
Chicago Wolves (IHL) players
Denver Rangers players
Detroit Red Wings players
Flint Generals players
Flint Spirits players
Grand Rapids Griffins (IHL) players
HC Davos players
Ice hockey players from Michigan
Ice hockey players at the 1988 Winter Olympics
Indianapolis Ice players
Michigan State Spartans men's ice hockey players
New York Islanders players
New York Rangers draft picks
New York Rangers players
Olympic ice hockey players of the United States
Ottawa Senators players
Pittsburgh Penguins players
St. Louis Blues players
San Jose Sharks players
Sportspeople from Lansing, Michigan
Washington Capitals players
NCAA men's ice hockey national champions